Carl August Dohrn (27 June 1806 – 10 May 1892) was a German entomologist.

Biography
Born at Stettin (Szczecin, now Poland) Carl August was the son of Heinrich Dohrn, who was a wine and spice merchant, and had made the family fortune by trading in sugar. This wealth allowed Carl August to devote himself to his various hobbies; travelling, folk music and entomology.

Although interested in all orders of insects Dohrn specialised in Coleoptera. His first published paper was in the Entomologische Zeitung for 1845 but he was an active entomologist long before this, since he had acted as Secretary to the Stettin Entomological Society from its foundation in 1839 and edited its journal. He was elected president of the society in 1843 retiring from the post in 1887.During this time he held together the rather fractious German entomologists and the society flourished. Dohrn had many contacts including Alexander Henry Haliday, with whom he wrote a paper on the Linnaean Diptera (See Talk:Carl August Dohrn) and the London entomologists. He was a personal friend of Henry Tibbats Stainton with whom he stayed in England.

A frequent visitor to London he was accompanied by the Lepidopterist, Philipp Christoph Zeller in 1852, by Carl Henrik Boheman in 1854 and by Hermann August Hagen in 1857. He spent many summers in Italy, in Lucca with Haliday and in Turin with Maximilian Spinola. Dohrn was elected a fellow of the Entomological Society of London in 1855 and an honorary member in 1855. A classicist he was fluent in many European languages. His Coleoptera collection was very extensive and just prior to his death, at 86, he had received upwards of 1,000 beetles from Sumatra.

Family
Dohrn's son Anton Dohrn, an ardent supporter of Charles Darwin, became a famous marine zoologist. Another, older, son Heinrich Wolfgang Ludwig Dohrn was also an entomologist.

References
 J. W. D[ouglas] Obituary. In: Entomologist's Monthly Magazine. 2. Serie, Band 3 (= Band 25), 1892, S. 164–165 (Online)

External links
  Gaedike, R.; Groll, E. K. & Taeger, A. 2012: Bibliography of the entomological literature from the beginning until 1863 : online database - version 1.0 - Senckenberg Deutsches Entomologisches Institut. Bibliography (Citations)

1806 births
1892 deaths
Scientists from Szczecin
German entomologists
People from the Province of Pomerania
Fellows of the Royal Entomological Society